Pistol Annies are an American country music group composed of Miranda Lambert, Ashley Monroe, and Angaleena Presley. The trio gave its debut performance on April 4, 2011, on the CBS special Academy of Country Music's Girls' Night Out: Superstar Women of Country. The trio have released four studio albums for Sony Music Nashville.

Career
Pistol Annies made their debut on April 22, 2011, on the Academy of Country Music's Girls' Night Out: Superstar Women of Country on CBS, performing "Hell on Heels". The women gave themselves the nicknames "Lonestar Annie" (Lambert), "Hippie Annie" (Monroe), and "Holler Annie" (Presley). They released the album Hell on Heels on August 23, 2011, with the title song being released for purchase on their website two months earlier, on June 12. After a series of performances during Lambert concerts, the Pistol Annies performed three sold-out headlining shows in December 2011 with guest performances by John Fogerty and Blake Shelton.

The trio was featured on the track "Come All Ye Fair and Tender Ladies" on the 2012 album Voice of Ages by The Chieftains. The Pistol Annies song "Run Daddy Run" appears on the soundtrack album The Hunger Games: Songs from District 12 and Beyond. The band performed their autobiographical single "Takin' Pills" at the 2012 CMT Music Awards.

Annie Up, the trio's second studio album, was released on May 7, 2013. It was preceded by the lead single "Hush Hush," which became the Pistol Annies' first chart entry on the U.S. Billboard Hot Country Songs chart. The group is also featured on the Blake Shelton single, "Boys 'Round Here," from his 2013 album, Based on a True Story….

The group cancelled all tour stops in June 2013, according to their record label, "due to unforeseen circumstances".  Lambert still performed as a solo act in June. Monroe went to the Mermaids of Alcatraz Tour with Train. In August 2014, Angaleena Presley confirmed that the group was on temporary hiatus, saying that due to the success of Lambert's and Monroe's solo careers, the band "just had to take a little break but never say never." Whilst promoting their appearances at the 2016 C2C festival, both Miranda Lambert and Ashley Monroe stressed that the Pistol Annies had not disbanded and intended to work together when all three members were available. They also stated their hope to one day do a UK tour.

In 2017, the Annies recorded a cover of the song "Tulsa Time" which appeared on a Don Williams tribute album titled Gentle Giants: The Songs of Don Williams which was released on May 26. In an interview with Billboard, Lambert revealed that a new Pistol Annies album would be released in 2018. On September 26, 2018, the Pistol Annies released three tracks from their latest album, Interstate Gospel, which was released on November 2, 2018. They performed a fourth track, "Sugar Daddy", at the CMT Artists of the Year telecast.

The Pistol Annies appeared in Nashville on June 6–9 for 2019 CMA Fest. In September 2019, the Pistol Annies began touring as part of Miranda Lambert's Roadside Bars and Pink Guitars tour, which runs through November 23.

Discography

Studio albums

Singles

As a featured artist

Other charted songs

Music videos

Collaborations and non album tracks
"Come All Ye Fair and Tender Ladies" (2012) with The Chieftains, featured on Voice of Ages
"Run Daddy Run" (2012)  featured on The Hunger Games: Songs from District 12 and Beyond
"Blue Christmas" (2012) featured on Blake Shelton's Cheers, It's Christmas
"You Were Meant For Me" (2013) featured on Jewel's "Greatest Hits"
"Tulsa Time" (2017) featured on Gentle Giants: A Tribute to Don Williams"

Notes

Awards

References

All-female bands
Country music groups from Tennessee
Country music supergroups
Musical groups established in 2011
RCA Records Nashville artists
American musical trios
Miranda Lambert
2011 establishments in Tennessee